Corymbophanes kaiei is a species of catfish in the family Loricariidae. It is native to South America, where it occurs in the Potaro River basin in the Essequibo River drainage. It is usually found in fast-moving, sunlit riffles among cobble and submerged logs. The species reaches  SL.

References

Ancistrini
Catfish of South America
Fish described in 2000